slk or SLK may stand for:

 SLK (gene), a gene that in humans encodes the enzyme STE20-like serine/threonine-protein kinase
 SLK (group), a British grime music group
 Adirondack Regional Airport, US (IATA code)
 Mercedes-Benz SLK, a sports car
 SilkAir (ICAO code)
 Slovak language (ISO 639-2 code)
 SLK, a 2014 album by Stam1na
 .slk, filename extension for the SYmbolic LinK (SYLK) format
 Starostové pro Liberecký kraj (Mayors for Liberec Region), Czech political party